KAIS International School is an international school located in Shinagawa, Tokyo, Japan. KAIS provides an English-based education to international junior high and high school students living in Tokyo.

KAIS International School offers programs for grades 9-12 and integrates SAT preparation, art, photography, theater, and other creative classes, yoga, science laboratories, team sports, digital music composition, academic writing, and literature classes into its California-benchmark based curriculum. KAIS's educational philosophy is based on small class sizes, and is influenced by Steiner and Montessori educational theory. It uses the "One MacBook per student" educational philosophy, and is affiliated with Kikokushijo Academy in Setagaya.

External links
 
 KAIS International School at tokyoweekender.com

High schools in Tokyo
Junior high schools in Japan
American international schools in Japan
International schools in Tokyo
Private schools in Japan
Shinagawa